Kirkdale railway station is a railway station in Kirkdale, Liverpool, England, located to the north of the city centre on the Northern Line of the Merseyrail network. It acts as the interchange between the branches to Kirkby and Ormskirk; these lines diverge just north of the station.

Kirkdale TMD train maintenance depot, the largest depot on the Merseyrail Network, is located adjacent to the station.

History
The station originally opened as Bootle Lane was built by the Liverpool, Ormskirk and Preston Railway and Liverpool and Bury Railway at the start of their joint line into Liverpool, opening in 1848. In 1977 it became part of the Merseyrail network's Northern Line.

Five tunnels
The station is aligned north–south. When facing north, five tunnel portals can be seen north of the platforms.

To the west lies a cluster of three very short tunnels, running under a road. These tunnels were to give greater throughput, and are all on the same line. The westernmost tunnel is used for shunting. The next tunnel is the main Merseyrail Northern Line tunnel. The third tunnel is disused, but was in use until 1968 as the fast line for expresses to Yorkshire and Manchester.

To the east is a cluster of two tunnels. The easternmost tunnel was an abandoned project. The adjacent tunnel runs in tunnels and cuttings to the disused Walton on the Hill station, and was a part of the North Liverpool Extension Line. This section of line was used from 1879 to 1979; however, trains running on it never called at Kirkdale station.

Freight lines
Two freight lines passed through or under the station.

The busy Canada Dock Branch freight-only line serving Liverpool Docks passes under the station, roughly north-east to south-west, via a tunnel.

The North Liverpool Extension Line, also referred to as the eastern section of the Outer Loop, emerged from the north out of a tunnel next to the station, running parallel to the west platform. This section of line was used from 1879 to 1979.

Facilities
The station (as is usual for most on Merseyrail) is fully staffed throughout the hours of service all week. The platforms are fully accessible and step-free (as noted above) and there are shelters, customer information screens and timetable poster boards on each platform. Train running information is also offered by automated announcements. The station has two car-parking spaces for disabled users and cycle racks for 10 cycles.

Services
Trains operate every 15 minutes, Monday-Saturday daytime to either Kirkby or Ormskirk to the north, and every 5 or 10 minutes to Liverpool Central to the south. During the evenings after 20:00 and all day Sundays, services are every 30 minutes to Kirkby and Ormskirk, and every 15 minutes to Liverpool.

Gallery

References

External links

Railway stations in Liverpool
DfT Category E stations
Former Lancashire and Yorkshire Railway stations
Railway stations served by Merseyrail
Railway stations in Great Britain opened in 1848